Emil Drozdowicz (born 5 July 1986) is a Polish professional footballer who plays as a forward for Stilon Gorzów Wielkopolski.

Career

Club
In July 2009, he was loaned to Arka Gdynia on a one-year deal from Lechia Zielona Góra.
In the winter 2010, he joined GKP Gorzów Wlkp. on a three-year deal.

In May 2011, he joined Polonia Bytom.

In June 2011, he joined LKS Nieciecza on a two-year contract.

In February 2016, he joined Wisła Płock from Termalica Bruk-Bet for free.

In July 2017, he joined Chojniczanka Chojnice from Wisła Płock for free.

On 7 July 2020, he signed with Wisła Puławy.

On 19 July 2022, he returned to Gorzów Wielkopolski to rejoin Stilon.

References

External links
 
 

1986 births
People from Sulęcin
Sportspeople from Lubusz Voivodeship
Living people
Polish footballers
Association football forwards
Lechia Zielona Góra players
Stilon Gorzów Wielkopolski players
Arka Gdynia players
Polonia Bytom players
Bruk-Bet Termalica Nieciecza players
Wisła Płock players
Chojniczanka Chojnice players
Wisła Puławy players
Ekstraklasa players
I liga players
II liga players
III liga players